Kevin C. O'Connor is a Professor of History holding the Departmental Chair at Gonzaga University in Spokane, Washington.

Books
 History of the Baltic States (Greenwood Press, 2003)
 Intellectuals and Apparatchiks: Russian Nationalism and the Gorbachev Revolution (Lexington Books, 2006)
 Culture and Customs of the Baltic States (Greenwood Press, 2006).

References

External links 
Faculty Biography at Gonzaga college

1967 births
Living people
Writers from New York City
University at Albany, SUNY alumni
Gonzaga University faculty
Historians from New York (state)